Plerodia is a genus of longhorn beetles of the subfamily Lamiinae, containing the following species:

 Plerodia singularis Thomson, 1868
 Plerodia syrinx (Bates, 1865)

References

Onciderini